Neoplocaederus fucatus is a species of beetle belonging to the family Cerambycidae.

Distribution
This species can be found in Cameroon, Gabon, Ghana, Nigeria, Uganda, Democratic Republic of Congo, Republic of the Congo, São Tomé and Principe and Togo.

References
 Biolib
 Global Species
 Cerambycoidea

Cerambycini
Beetles of Africa
Beetles described in 1858